Otterbury was located in the Conception Bay North area with the post office located in Clarkes Beach. It had a population of 104 by 1956.

Otterbury is a community within the town of Clarkes Beach.

See also
 List of communities in Newfoundland and Labrador

Populated coastal places in Canada
Populated places in Newfoundland and Labrador